Nash Harbor is an unincorporated community on Nunivak Island in Bethel Census Area, Alaska, United States. Nash Harbor is located on the western shore of the bay of the same name, on the northern coast of the island. The community was originally a Yupik settlement and had a population of 49 in 1950. Ellikarrmiut Summer Science Field Camp, a college-level biology camp, is held in Nash Harbor.

Demographics

Nash Harbor appeared once on the U.S. Census in 1950 as an unincorporated village. It has not returned since.

References

Further reading
Paul Souders. Ellikarrmiut Economy. Animal Resource Use at Nash Harbor (49-NI-003), Nunivak Island, Alaska.  Archaeology at Nash Harbor; bibliography.

Unincorporated communities in Bethel Census Area, Alaska
Unincorporated communities in Alaska
Unincorporated communities in Unorganized Borough, Alaska